Villa To Village is a 2018 Tamil language reality talent game show, airing on Star Vijay every Saturday and Sunday at 21:30 (IST) beginning 10 March 2018. The show was hosted by Andrews.

Synopsis
The show takes twelve city women and relocates them to a village where they have no money and must make ends meet for forty days.

Participants

References

External links
 Villa To Village on Hotstar
 

Star Vijay original programming
2018 Tamil-language television series debuts
Tamil-language television shows
Tamil-language reality television series
Tamil-language game shows
2018 Tamil-language television series endings